The Oceania Hockey Federation is the governing body for the sport of field hockey in Oceania. It organises the Oceania Cup. It is affiliated with the International Hockey Federation (FIH).

Member associations

  Australia
  Fiji
  New Zealand
  Papua New Guinea
  Samoa
  Solomon Islands
  Tonga
  Vanuatu

National team rankings

References

External links
 

International Hockey Federation
Field hockey organizations
Field hockey in Oceania
Sports governing bodies in Oceania